Zoltán Dionys Avrad Jeney (13 May 1910 — 7 January 1989) was a Hungarian ice hockey player. He played for the Hungarian national team at the 1936 Winter Olympics and several World Championships.

References

External links

1910 births
1989 deaths
Hungarian ice hockey right wingers
Ice hockey players at the 1936 Winter Olympics
Olympic ice hockey players of Hungary
Ice hockey people from Budapest